The Mayor of Napier is the head of the municipal government of Napier, New Zealand, and presides over the Napier City Council. Napier is New Zealand's ninth largest city. The first mayor was elected in 1875. The current mayor is Kirsten Wise.

History
The Māori sold a block of land called Ahuriri in 1851, and in 1853 Donald McLean bought the site that later became Napier. Alfred Domett, a future Prime Minister of New Zealand, was appointed as the Commissioner of Crown Lands and the resident magistrate at the village of Ahuriri. It was decided to place a planned town here, its streets and avenues were laid out, and the new town named for Sir Charles Napier.

The area initially fell under the control of the Wellington Province. The New Provinces Act, 1858 created the Hawke's Bay Province and Napier became its capital. Superintendent John Davies Ormond worked towards Napier becoming self-governing, and it was designated as a borough in 1874. The first election for a borough council were held on 18 January 1875. Nine councillors were elected from 22 contestants, and the councillors chose Robert Stuart from their group as their first mayor. Stuart was mayor until December 1878.

John Vautier succeeded Stuart from December 1878 until May 1882. At the first borough election in 1875, he had been the highest polling councillor. He was succeeded by Dr William Isaac Spencer from June 1882 to December 1885.

George Swan began his long mayoralty in December 1885. He held it until April 1901; at that time, he had the longest continuous mayoralty in New Zealand.

John McVay succeeded Swan and was mayor from April 1901 to April 1902. Frederic Wanklyn Williams was mayor in 1902–1904.

Samuel Carnell succeeded McVay in 1904. He was mayor until 1907.

Vigor Brown was first elected mayor in 1907. During this first period, he retained the mayoralty for ten years until 1917. He was succeeded by Henry Hill, who had made his name in the Hawke's Bay as a school inspector and educationalist. Hill held the mayoralty from 1917 to 1919. Brown had a second period as mayor from 1919 to 1921, and was succeeded by J B Andrew from 1921 to 1927. Brown succeeded Andrew for his third period, this time from 1927 to 1933. The 1931 Hawke's Bay earthquake fell into Brown's last period, and temporary governance arrangement included a Napier Citizens' Control Committee, followed by a two-man Government Commission. John Barton and L. B. Campbell were farewelled by the mayor in May 1933, when their term ended and the municipal affairs once again rested with the borough council. The resulting mayoral election was contested by the incumbent and C O Morse, the chairman of the Earthquake Relief Committee. The election caused great interest, and Morse and Brown received 4110 and 1808 votes, respectively. At the time, mayoral elections were held every two years, but the 1931 election had been skipped due to the earthquake.

Morse was mayor until 1938, defeated by Bill Hercock who had a twelve-year term (1938–1950). E R Spriggs succeeded Hercock from 1950 to 1956.

Peter Tait was mayor from 1956 to 1974. He was knighted the year after he ceased being mayor.

Barbara Arnot was first elected in 2001. Bill Dalton succeeded her in 2013.

Members of Parliament
Four Napier mayors have also served as Members of Parliament. All four represented the Napier electorate in the House of Representatives:
 George Swan (1890–1893)
 Samuel Carnell (1893–1896)
 Vigor Brown (1908–1922)
 Peter Tait (1951–1951)

List of mayors of Napier

List of deputy mayors of Napier

References

 
Napier